Mikael Egill Ellertsson (born 11 March 2002) is an Icelandic professional football player who plays for Italian  club Venezia.

Club career 
Mikael Ellertsson made his professional debut for SPAL on the 14 August 2021, replacing Moustapha Yabre during the 2-1 Coppa Italia loss against Benevento, just a few days after scoring a brace in the 5-0 friendly win against Adriese.

On 30 August 2021 he signed a 5-years contract for Spezia; on the same day he returned to SPAL on loan until 2022.

On 26 January 2023, Mikael joined Venezia in Serie B and signed a contract through the 2026–27 season.

International career
He made his debut for the Iceland national football team on 8 October 2021 in a World Cup qualifier against Armenia.

Honours
International
Baltic Cup: 2022

References

External links

Ellertsson, Mikael Egill
Ellertsson, Mikael Egill
Icelandic footballers
Iceland youth international footballers
Iceland international footballers
Ellertsson, Mikael Egill
Sportspeople from Reykjavík
Ellertsson, Mikael Egill
Ellertsson, Mikael Egill
Ellertsson, Mikael Egill
Ellertsson, Mikael Egill
Ellertsson, Mikael Egill
Icelandic expatriate footballers
Ellertsson, Mikael Egill
Icelandic expatriate sportspeople in Italy